Modell is the German word for "model" and also a surname. It may refer to:

People 
 Arnold Modell (1924–2022), American professor of social psychiatry
 Art Modell (1925–2012), American business executive and sports team owner
 Bernadette Modell, (born 1935), British geneticist
 David Modell (1961–2017), American business executive and sports team owner
 Frank Modell (1917-2016), American cartoonist
 Merriam Modell (1908–1994), American author of pulp fiction
 Pat Modell (1931–2011), American TV actress
 Rod Modell, given name for Deepchord, electronic music producer from Detroit, Michigan
 William Modell (1921–2008), American businessman and chairman of Modell's Sporting Goods

Companies 
 Modell's, a sporting goods retailer based in New York City
 Modell (pawn shop), a pawnbroker based in New York City, originally formed as a spinoff of the sporting goods company
 Schabak Modell, a die-cast toy producer in Germany
 Schuco Modell, a die-cast toy producer in Germany

Media and entertainment 
 Das Modell, a song recorded by the electro-pop group Kraftwerk
 Modell Bianka, a 1951 East German film
 Robert Patrick Modell, a character in episodes of the TV series X-files

Other uses 
 Berliner Modell, a learning theory
 Modell M and Modell S, types of Mauser bolt-action rifles
 V-Modell, an software development model

See also 
 Model (disambiguation)
 Modella, Victoria, a rural locality in Australia
 Micky Modelle, a music DJ and producer
 Modello, the Italian word for "model" or preparatory study for a work of art